Colonel Sir Arthur Richard Holbrook, KBE, VD, JP, DL (28 April 1850 – 24 December 1946) was a British newspaper proprietor and Conservative MP for Basingstoke.

He won the seat at a by-election in 1920, lost it in 1923, was re-elected in 1924, and stood down in 1929.

He was a newspaper proprietor; founder of Southern Daily Mail; Fellow of the Institute of Journalists; President of the Newspaper Society, 1913–14; Chairman of Portsmouth Conservative Association, 1885–98; President of Portsmouth Chamber of Commerce, 1907–12; Commanded Royal Army Service Corps, Salisbury Plain District, 1914–19.

References

Conservative Party (UK) MPs for English constituencies
1850 births
People from Bath, Somerset
Year of death missing
British newspaper founders
British newspaper people
Royal Army Service Corps officers
British Army personnel of World War I
Knights Commander of the Order of the British Empire
English justices of the peace
Deputy Lieutenants
1946 deaths

External links